Myloplus arnoldi is a medium to large omnivorous fish of the family Serrasalmidae from South America, where it is found in the Amazon, Xingu and Tocantins River basins.
They are also called the silver dollar and are one of the fish referred to as "silver dollars".  
These fish are capable of delivering serious bites to humans.

Etymology
The fish is named in honor of German aquarist Johann Paul Arnold (1869-1952), who donated the type specimens to the Zoological Museum of Berlin.

References

Jégu, M., 2003. Serrasalminae (Pacus and piranhas). p. 182-196. In R.E. Reis, S.O. Kullander and C.J. Ferraris, Jr. (eds.) Checklist of the Freshwater Fishes of South and Central America. Porto Alegre: EDIPUCRS, Brasil.

Serrasalmidae
Freshwater fish of Brazil
Fish of the Amazon basin
Taxa named by Ernst Ahl
Fish described in 1936